"Constant Headache" is a song recorded by American rock band Joyce Manor. The song was released on January 11, 2011, as part of their self-titled debut album. It was also the namesake of the group's extended play of the same name, first released a year prior. The song is generally considered the band's signature song.

Background
Like many tracks on the band's debut, the song was developed over a period of many years. An early version of the song exists with an additional third verse, though Johnson has joked it would be too unusual to release, given fans' love of the original. He has admitted in an interview that the song's melody was inspired by the Human League's "Don't You Want Me Baby". Listeners have theorized that the song's lyrics were written from the perspective of a dog, though Johnson has expressed confusion at this: "I can't pin down exactly which line it is that suggests that. Clearly, there's something there because it's too strange of a coincidence."

Reception
"Constant Headache" rapidly became the band's most popular song, a frequent encore at their concerts. Johnson remembered in an interview that the lyrics of the song, combined with GIF images from the band's shows, spread on social media sites like Tumblr, including early word-of-mouth for the act. The song has been covered by Conor Oberst's Desaparecidos.

Chris Payne at Billboard considered it the album's "biggest anthem," pointing out humorously that while the majority of its songs were fast and short, "Constant Headache" is the only song to stretch to three minutes. Spin contributor Brad Nelson retrospectively dubbed it "still their most enduring song, a knot of feeling shoved forward by its own chord progression, punk as temporary and awesome as a wave on beach." Whitney Shoemaker of Alternative Press recalled it as one of the most distinctive emo songs of 2011.

References

2011 songs